Volta is a 2004 action-adventure-comedy film directed by Wenn V. Deramas and starring Ai-Ai delas Alas as Volta. It was released under Star Cinema, ABS-CBN Film Productions. The story concerns an ordinary woman who was given the power of electricity and used this gift for the common good by becoming a caped crusader donning a red suit. The film would serve as the inspiration for 2008 TV series of the same name, albeit a different setting, storyline and a more comedic tone.

Plot
Perla is a dressmaker who lives and works for her siblings, Percy and Penny since her mother died. After being hit by lightning thrice, Perla discovers that she has developed superpowers: She can generate heat and electricity with her hands, and lightning flashes come out of her hands. With these powers, she becomes famous as the superhero, Volta. However, her siblings resent her, as they blame her powers for mishaps they encountered earlier in their lives. Perla is initially reluctant to use her powers openly but meets Ama, a ball of light with a human face who encourages him to use her powers for good and teaches her how to manage them. 

Volta's main antagonist is Celphora , who wants to use Volta as a power source for her Telstra Technology. She sends her minions on the rampage to lure Volta into revealing herself before posing as a workmate of Percy to lure him into spilling his sister's secret by pretending to comfort him after another quarrel with Perla over her powers, only to capture him and Penny to use as bait for Volta. Celphora demands that Volta transfer her powers to her in exchange for her siblings' freedom which she complies, But despite gaining her powers, Celphora is killed by Volta using her lightning with a steel rod. Her siblings, now realizing the need for Volta and Perla's sacrifice, reconcile with their sister.

Cast
Ai-Ai delas Alas as Perla Magtoto / Volta
Diether Ocampo as Lloyd Ventura
Jean Garcia as Kelly Tanjuakio / Celphora
Justin Cuyugan as Percy Magtoto
Bobby Andrews as Oh-Vlading
Onemig Bondoc as Oh-Blah-Blah
Eugene Domingo as Nancy
Boy Abunda as Ama
Pauleen Luna as Penny Magtoto
Chokoleit† as Denden
Mura as 9 Volts
Eddie Gil as President

Cameo
Sandara Park as herself
Hero Angeles as himself
Roxanne Guinoo as herself
Joross Gamboa as himself
Melissa Ricks as herself
Laurenti Dyogi as himself
JV Villar as TV reporter
Randy Santiago as MTB host
Mickey Ferriols as MTB host
Piolo Pascual (from Milan)
Claudine Barretto  (from Milan)
Hazel Ann Mendoza as young Perla
John Manalo as young Percy
Moreen Guesse as young Penny

References

External links
 

2004 films
2004 in the Philippines
2000s superhero films
Star Cinema films
2000s Tagalog-language films
Philippine superhero films
Films directed by Wenn V. Deramas